Julius Sterling Morton, also known as J. Sterling Morton, is a 1937 bronze sculpture of Julius Sterling Morton by Rudulph Evans, installed in the United States Capitol Visitor Center, in Washington, D.C., as part of the National Statuary Hall Collection. It is one of two statues donated by the state of Nebraska.  The sculpture was accepted into the collection by Congressman Karl Stefan of Nebraska on April 27, 1937.
 
The statue is one of two that Evans has placed in the collection, the other being William Jennings Bryan, also from  Nebraska.

On March 1, 2019, it was announced the state of Nebraska will replace the statue with one of the author Willa Cather. The Morton statue will be relocated to a yet-to-be determined location.

See also
 1937 in art

References

External links
 

1937 establishments in Washington, D.C.
1937 sculptures
Bronze sculptures in Washington, D.C.
Monuments and memorials in Washington, D.C.
Morton, Julius Sterling
Sculptures of men in Washington, D.C.